Caryocolum similellum is a moth of the family Gelechiidae. It is found in northern Iran.

The length of the forewings is about 5 mm. The ground colour of the forewings is dark brown and the hindwings are shining grey. Adults have been recorded on wing mid-June.

References

Moths described in 1989
similellum
Moths of Asia